Xenortholitha corioidea is a species of moth of the  family Geometridae. It is found in Taiwan.

The wingspan is 34–38 mm.

References

Moths described in 1911
Cidariini